Ischnocodia annulus, common name golden target beetle or ringed tortoise beetle, is a species of turtle beetle in the family Chrysomelidae.

See also
 Golden tortoise beetle

References

Cassidinae
Beetles of South America
Beetles described in 1781
Taxa named by Johan Christian Fabricius